NGC 483 is a spiral galaxy in the constellation Pisces. It is located approximately 192 million light-years from Earth and was discovered on November 11, 1827 by astronomer John Herschel.

See also  
 Spiral galaxy 
 List of NGC objects (1–1000)

References

External links 
 
 
 SEDS

Spiral galaxies
Pisces (constellation)
0483
4961
Astronomical objects discovered in 1827